Pyrenophora seminiperda is a minor plant pathogen that causes leaf spots on many grasses. It is an important generalist grass seed pathogen which causes visible cylindrical masses of black fungal hyphae (stromata) to grow from infected seeds. Hence the common name "black fingers of death" It has been hypothesized that the fungus arrived in North America with invasive grasses from Eurasia. BFOD has been suggested as a method of biocontrol of the invasive cheatgrass, one of the most important invasive species in the USA. Various secondary metabolites of the fungus, including Cytochalasin B, Pyrenophoric Acid-B, and Spirostaphylotrichin W, appears to be responsible for the seed killing.

References

External links
Dr. Erin Mordecai discusses BFOD and Cheatgrass during a seminar at the Department of Ecology and Evolutionary Biology at University of Michigan, Feb. 16, 2017
 Index Fungorum
 USDA ARS Fungal Database

Pyrenophora
Fungal plant pathogens and diseases
Wheat diseases